Íñigo Fernández de Velasco, 4th Duke of Frías, Grandee of Spain, (in full), ( – 1585), was a Spanish nobleman.

Fernández de Velasco was the son of Juan Sancho de Tovar, 1st Marquis of Berlanga and of María Girón, Lady of Gandul and Marchenilla. His original name was Íñigo de Tovar y Velasco, but he changed it and re-adopted his father's original last name when he inherited the Dukedom of Frías from his uncle Pedro Fernández de Velasco, who had no issue. He married Ana Pérez de Guzmán y Aragón, daughter of Juan Alfonso Pérez de Guzmán, 6th Duke of Medina Sidonia, with whom he had eleven children, among whom Juan Fernández de Velasco, 5th Duke of Frías.

Sources

1520 births
1585 deaths
104
Marquesses of Berlanga
106
Counts of Castilnovo
Inigo
Inigo 04
Knights of the Golden Fleece
Grandees of Spain